Quinnia is a genus of minute sea snails, marine gastropod mollusks or micromollusks in the subfamily Seguenziinae of the family Seguenziidae.

Quinnia is a replacement name for Seguenziella Marshall, 1983, a junior homonym of Seguenziella  Neviani, 1901

Description
The shape of the shell is conical. It has a peripheral carina and sharp, collabral axial riblets. There is no microsculpture. All whorls possess midwhorl angulation. Spiral lirae are present on some whorls. The shallow posterior sinus has a V-shape. The anterolateral sinus forms a channel. The basal sinus is present. There is no columellar sinus. The aperture has a rhomboidal shape. The columellar tooth is present. There is no umbilical septum.

Radula: the rachidian tooth is higher than broad and has lateral wings reduced or absent. The lateral tooth cusp is narrow. There are less than 10 marginal tooth pairs.

Species
Species within the genus Quinnia include:
 Quinnia cazioti (Dautzenberg, 1925)
 Quinnia ionica (Watson, 1878)
 Quinnia laetifica Marshall, 1991
 Quinnia limatula Marshall, 1991
 Quinnia patula (Marshall, 1983)
 Quinnia polita (Verco, 1906)
 Quinnia rushi (Dall, 1927)
 Quinnia sykesi (Schepman, 1909)

References

External links
 Marshall, B. A. (1983). Recent and Tertiary Seguenziidae (Mollusca: Gastropoda) from the New Zealand region. New Zealand Journal of Zoology. 10: 235-262
 Marshall B.A. (1991). Mollusca Gastropoda : Seguenziidae from New Caledonia and the Loyalty Islands. In A. Crosnier & P. Bouchet (Eds) Résultats des campagnes Musorstom, vol. 7. Mémoires du Muséum National d'Histoire Naturelle, A, 150:41-109

 
Seguenziidae
Gastropod genera